The 1984–85 Biathlon World Cup was a multi-race tournament over a season of biathlon, organised by the UIPMB (Union Internationale de Pentathlon Moderne et Biathlon). The season started on 10 January 1985 in Minsk, Soviet Union, and ended on 9 March 1985 in Holmenkollen, Norway. It was the eighth season of the Biathlon World Cup.

In Oberhof, the skating style of skiing made its introduction to biathlon. It was somewhat of a revolution as the skating style is quite a lot faster than the classic style. Some athletes did not adapt as quickly to the new style, and some nations, including West Germany and Norway, petitioned for a ban of the skating style.

There was originally going to be held a relay in Holmenkollen, but the relay had to be cancelled due to fog.

New scoring system
The World Cup scoring system was changed before this season.

Calendar
Below is the World Cup calendar for the 1984–85 season.

 1985 World Championship races were not included in the 1984–85 World Cup scoring system.

*The relays were technically unofficial races as they did not count towards anything in the World Cup.

Women's calendar

*The relays were technically unofficial races as they did not count towards anything in the World Cup.

World Cup Podium

Men

Women

Standings: Men

Overall 

Final standings after 10 races.

Standings: Women

Overall 

Final standings after 8 races.

Achievements
First World/European Cup career victory
, 23, in her 1st season — the EC 1 Individual in Minsk; it also was her first podium
, in his 2nd season — the WC 1 Individual in Minsk; it also was his first podium
, in her 1st season — the EC 2 Individual in Antholz-Anterselva; it also was her first podium
, 31, in his 8th season — the WC 3 Sprint in Antholz-Anterselva; first podium was 1979–80 Individual in Antholz-Anterselva
, in his 2nd season — the WC 4 Individual in Lahti; it also was his first podium
, in her 3rd season — the EC 3 Sprint in Lahti; first podium was 1982–83 Sprint in Lappeenranta

First World/European Cup podium
, 20, in her 1st season — no. 2 in the EC 1 Individual in Minsk
, in her 1st season — no. 3 in the EC 1 Individual in Minsk
, 22, in his 3rd season — no. 3 in the WC 3 Individual in Antholz-Anterselva
, in her 1st season — no. 2 in the EC 2 Individual in Antholz-Anterselva
, in her 1st season — no. 3 in the EC 2 Individual in Antholz-Anterselva
, 21, in his 3rd season — no. 3 in the WC 3 Sprint in Antholz-Anterselva
, 24, in his 2nd season — no. 3 in the WC 4 Individual in Lahti
, 20, in his 2nd season — no. 3 in the WC 4 Sprint in Lahti

Victory in this World/European Cup (all-time number of victories in parentheses)
, 4 (6) first places
, 2 (6) first places
, 2 (2) first place
, 1 (2) first place
, 1 (2) first place
, 1 (1) first place
, 1 (1) first place
, 1 (1) first place
, 1 (1) first place
, 1 (1) first place

Retirements
Following notable biathletes retired after the 1984–85 season:

Notes
1.  The Aftenposten source gives a bit different scores and places France 3rd, Norway 4th, Italy 5th and Austria 7th. The Sports Book has been given precedent as that also shows whence the scores came.
2.  This was an unofficial version of the Nation Cup that ultimately would be implemented in the 1986–87 season, though in this version only the individual races counted.
3.  The Lahti Ski Museum has omitted Meloche from the list of results for some reason, but Aftenposten and the Sports Book includes her.

References

Biathlon World Cup
World Cup